The Angel Esmeralda: Nine Stories is a collection of short stories by Don DeLillo. The nine stories are printed in chronological order and were written between 1979 and 2011. It is DeLillo's first such collection.

Contents

Reception 

The collection was widely praised by critics. The Guardian described the stories as "masterfully designed" and "great art." Writing in The New Yorker, Martin Amis said: "These nine pieces add up to something considerable, and form a vital addition to the corpus." The New York Times called the stories "excellent" and said "DeLillo packs fertile ruminations and potent consolation into each of these rich, dense, concentrated stories." The Daily Telegraph called the stories "robustly brilliant."

Awards
 Finalist, 2011 The Story Prize
 Finalist, 2012 PEN/Faulkner Award for Fiction

External links
The Angel Esmeralda (Scribner edition) at the Internet Archive

References

Short story collections by Don DeLillo
PEN/Faulkner Award for Fiction-winning works
2011 short story collections
Charles Scribner's Sons books
Postmodern novels